Hugh Pearson McIntyre  (12 October 1888 – 21 September 1982) was a New Zealand farmer and freezing company chairman. He was born in Waikaka Valley, Southland, New Zealand, on 12 October 1888. He was one of the founders of the Alliance Freezing Company (Southland) in 1948.

During World War I, McIntyre saw active service in Egypt and France, and he was awarded the Military Medal for gallantry in the field. 

In the 1964 Queen's Birthday Honours, McIntyre was appointed an Officer of the Order of the British Empire, for services to local government and to farming.

References

1888 births
1982 deaths
New Zealand farmers
People from Gore, New Zealand
New Zealand Officers of the Order of the British Empire
New Zealand recipients of the Military Medal
New Zealand military personnel of World War I